Stone Cold World is the second album by Latino-American rapper A.L.T. It was released on September 21, 1993. The ten-track album featured guest appearances from Rich Garcia.

Track listing

Personnel 
 Andre "The Unknown DJ" Manuel - producer (track 6), executive producer
 Alvin Trivette - main artist
 Cliff Badowski - photography
 Kevin Reeves - mastering
 Mike "Webeboomindashit" Edwards - recording and mixing (tracks 2-10)
 Richard - recording and mixing (tracks 1)
 Star Traxx  - producer (tracks 1-5, 7-10)
 Tony Gonzalez - producer (tracks 1-5, 7-10), executive producer
 Wendy Sherman - art direction, design

References

External links

1993 albums